Je ne connais pas cet homme is the sixth album by experimental French singer Brigitte Fontaine and the fourth by Areski Belkacem, released in 1973 on the Saravah label. It is their second collaborative album, and the first of a string of albums co-credited to both artists.

Track listing

References 

1973 albums
Brigitte Fontaine albums
Areski Belkacem albums